Formerly known as the Hôtel Concorde La Fayette, the Hyatt Regency Paris Étoile is a skyscraper hotel located near the Porte Maillot in the 17th arrondissement of Paris, France. The 995-room hotel is the second largest in Paris after the Le Méridien Étoile, and is part of the Palais des Congrès, one of the city's convention centers. It is the third-tallest building in the city of Paris (which does not contain the La Défense business district). A spire of 53 metres stands on its roof.

History
The hotel's location was formerly a free space, hosting amusement parks during the summer. After World War II, temporary buildings were quickly built there in order to host some services from French ministries. In 1960, facing the international boom in tourist and congress activities, the Chambre de Commerce et d'Industrie and the Tourism Committee decided to build a convention centre on the site. The selected architects were Henri Guibout, Serge Maloletenkov and Yves Betin. During that study, it was decided to build a large luxury hotel adjacent to the centre. The hotel opened in 1974 as the Hôtel Concorde La Fayette. 

It was sold in 2013 by Starwood Capital to Constellation Hotel Holdings (a division of Qatar Holdings) and became the Hyatt Regency Paris Etoile on 23 April, 2013.

Characteristics
 137 metres high, 190 metres with its antenna 
 995 rooms and suites on 34 floors
 Mayo Restaurant
 A Windo Skybar panoramic bar on the 34th floor
 35 reception rooms totalling 2,800 m2 of meeting space
 The Hyatt Catering service, which serves practical and gourmet dining in all areas of the Palais des Congrès

See also 
 Skyscraper
 List of tallest structures in Paris

References

External links 

Hyatt Regency Paris Etoile official website  
Palais des Congrès de Paris official website  

Hotels in Paris
Skyscrapers in Paris
Hotel buildings completed in 1974
Hotels established in 1974
Skyscraper hotels in France
Buildings and structures in the 17th arrondissement of Paris
Hyatt Hotels and Resorts
1974 establishments in France